Gandhaahalli  is a village in the southern state of Karnataka, India. It is located in the Krishnarajanagara taluk of Mysore district in Karnataka.

Demographics
As of 2001 India census, Gandhanahalli had a population of 5106 with 2585 males and 2521 females.
Gandhanhalli is located 56 km from district headquarters Mysore. This village name came from a man who is only son of a widower. his name is Gandha (Shrigandha). Both living in a jungle lonely. Gandha is the brave man. The goddess Adishakti Shri Hunasamma is located in south. Behind Hunasamma temple there was another temple i.e. Shri Anjaneya Swami temple. there is special in this temple. Most temples in the world are east faced but Anjaneya temple is west faced'

See also
 Mysore
 Districts of Karnataka

References

External links

Villages in Mysore district